Laurie Brown may refer to:

 Laurie Brown (bishop) (1907–1993), British Anglican bishop; Bishop of Warrington and of Birmingham
 Laurie Brown (physicist) (born 1923), American theoretical physicist
 Laurie Brown (footballer) (1937–1998), British footballer and manager
 Laurie Brown (broadcaster) (born 1957), Canadian television host
 Laurie Brown (photographer), (born 1978), American photographer

See also
Lawrence Brown (disambiguation)
Larry Brown (disambiguation)